An intelligent form is a form in which a programmer or interface designer has placed interactive elements that help the user comprehend and complete the form. The interaction can come in the form of online help, visual cues, and even artificial intelligence. The goal is for the user to complete the form correctly.

See also 
 Form (HTML)

References 
 

User interface techniques